Bruce Foods Corporation, founded in New Iberia, Louisiana, in 1928, is one of "America's largest privately owned food manufacturers," manufacturing many food products under five major labels, and is credited with "pioneering the canning of Mexican food." With four stateside manufacturing plants, the company has more than 1,200 employees.

Among its brands are Bruce Foods manufactures Cajun Injector marinades, Casa Fiesta Mexican Foods, Mexene Chili Products, and Choco Tacos.

Bruce Foods Brands

Cajun Injector Injectable Marinades  Injectable Marinades infuse flavor deep inside meat and seafood. No soak time is required for full flavor penetration.  Meat or seafood can be cooked immediately after injecting the marinade.  Cajun Injector offers a variety of flavors with the most popular being Creole Butter and Creole Garlic. 
Casa Fiesta Mexican Foods  Casa Fiesta offers a complete line of authentic Mexican prepared foods.  It is the only major brand of Mexican food still produced in El Paso, TX.  The line includes sauces, dips, shells, beans, rice, dinner kits, and seasoning mixes.  All products are made with natural ingredients.
Mexene  One hundred and one years ago, John Walker of the Walker Chili Co. developed Mexene Chili Powder in a small Texas town.  The flavor was designed to duplicate the popular taste of chili made by cowboys and loved by everyone in the area.  As the word spread and its reputation grew from winning chili recipe contests, Mexene's brand awareness and distribution grew along with it.  Today, Mexene is manufactured in El Paso, Texas by Bruce Foods.  The original recipe and manufacturing process remain the same as they were in 1906.
Cajun King Seasoning Mixes  A complete line of seafood mixes that are pre-measured and pre-mixed so that even the novice cook can make gourmet seafood meals in under 30 minutes.  The products are made with all natural ingredients and no preservatives.

Renewable energy practices
As part of its "Green Initiative", the company recently updated an  building in Wilson, North Carolina, with a renewable energy system designed to recover methane gas, a normal waste by-product that had, until now, been released into the atmosphere. The recovered gas assists with the plant's energy needs; additionally, the plant's water treatment system has accrued a  gas digester which is meant to ensure a more efficient water treatment process.

Preferential treatment contested
In 2009, Bruce Foods contested the decision by the Louisiana state budget panel to award ConAgra Foods, Inc., with a multimillion-dollar contract to construct a sweet potato facility. On the Moon Griffon radio show, Bruce Foods President Si Brown charged that the state's economic development office, headed by Stephen Moret, had unnecessarily underwritten the out-of-state competitor with tax dollars. Brown asserted that his company could have built the plant in question for $1 million, whereas ConAgra was granted a $37 million contract. According to Moret, since Bruce Foods has been unwilling to open up their ledgers, they were automatically disqualified from receiving state economic loans. Brown countered that since Bruce Foods is a privately held company, they are not required to file financial disclosures.

Cajun Injector lawsuit
Cajun Injector founder Chef Maurice "Reece" Williams sued Bruce Foods to the tune of $24 million in 2005, claiming that the company had not done due diligence promoting the product, as agreed upon when Williams sold his line of injectable marinades to Bruce Foods. According to a jury, Williams was unable to prove that he had been "fraudulently induced to sell the line of marinades", and instead ruled that Cajun Injector had breached the purchase agreement by not providing Bruce Foods with the marinade recipes. The jury also awarded Bruce Foods $224,000 in damages for debts incurred by Cajun Injector before the sale of purchase. Williams, however, was not held personally liable for any of the damages, which totaled $1.1 million.

Sponsorship
In the past, the company has sponsored "bull riding events" and NASCAR races at Michigan International Speedway. Bruce Foods Corp. President Si Brown commented on this decision by telling The New York Times, "The real consumers who keep hot sauce factories running are from the inner city and blue collar and young people who have grown up with it. There's still a lot of growth potential, because young people like spicy food. And more and more cheap food is being sold which needs hot sauce for flavor."

In its more recent history, Bruce Foods' former label, Louisiana Hot Sauce, has partnered with Football Fanatics, an online retailer, "to create a football 'Tailgating' theme as a consumer driven promotion."

In anticipation of the 50th anniversary of the Daytona 500, Louisiana Hot Sauce was one of many products to be stamped with a commemorative "50th race logo" at the Midwestern grocery chain Kroger.

Awards
In 1987, Bruce Foods received Business America's "E" award for excellence in exporting, an award given to companies that "have a long term record of exporting or providing export service." In 1990, the company received Business America's "E Star" award for outstanding contribution to the Export Expansion Program of the United States of America.  Business America singled out Bruce Foods for having been instrumental in expanding trade with Russia, helping sponsor the first Soviet-American Chef Exchange.

Bruce Foods has also been honored and awarded by Industry Organizations including the National Food Processors Association, the American Culinary Federation, the Paperboard Packaging Council, the Better Business Bureau and the National Association of Marketing Officials.

Officers
Chairman: Norman Brown Sr.
President and CEO: Joseph S. "Si" Brown III

Notes
Business America is a United States government publication that analyzes and covers American business and economic issues. It was followed by Export America, a now-defunct publication.

References

External links
 
Si Brown comments on ROI in El Paso manufacturing market
La. Looks to tap Russian market Brown comments on trade relations with Russia
Hoover's Profile Bruce Foods Corporation

Baking mixes
Food and drink companies established in 1928
Food manufacturers of the United States
New Iberia, Louisiana
1928 establishments in Louisiana
Food and drink companies based in Louisiana